Many of Mexico's older architectural structures, including entire sections of Pre-Hispanic and colonial cities, have been designated World Heritage sites for their historical and artistic significance. The country has the largest number of sites declared World Heritage Sites by UNESCO in the Americas.

Prehispanic Period

Important archaeological finds of the remains of structures built by the indigenous peoples of Mexico have been made in the country. The Mesoamerican civilizations that arose there developed a sophisticated architecture that evolved from simplistic to complex forms; in the north it was manifested in buildings of adobe and stone, the multi-storied housing as seen in Paquimé, and the cave dwellings of the Sierra Madre Occidental.

Monte Albán was long the seat of the dominant political power in the Central Valleys of Oaxaca, from the decline of San José Mogote until the demise of the city, which occurred around the 9th century. The native name of this city founded by the Zapotecs in the late Preclassic is still the subject of discussion. According to some sources, the original name was Dani Baá. It is known, however, that the local Mixtec called the city Yuku kúi (Green Hill) in their language.

Like most of the great Mesoamerican cities, Monte Albán was a city with a multi-ethnic population. Throughout its history, the city maintained strong ties to other peoples in Mesoamerica, especially with the Teotihuacans during the early Classic period. The city was abandoned by the social elite and much of the rest of its population at the end of Phase Xoo. However, the ceremonial enclosure that constitutes the complex of the archeological site of Monte Albán was reused by the Mixtec during the Postclassic period. By this time, the Zapotec people's political power was divided among various city-states, including Zaachila, Yagul, Lambityeco and Tehuantepec.

The Maya appear to have founded Lakam Ha about 100 B.C., during the Formative period (2500 B.C. – 300 A.D.), predominantly as a farmers' village favored by the numerous springs and streams nearby. The population of Lakam Ha grew during the Early Classic period (200–600) as it became a full-fledged city; during the Late Classic period (600–900) it was made the capital of the B'akaal ('bone') region in Chiapas and Tabasco. The oldest of the structures that have been discovered were built around the year 600.

B'akaal was an important center of Mayan civilization between the 5th and 9th centuries, during which it formed various, shifting alliances, and fought numerous wars with its enemies. On more than one occasion it made an alliance with Tikal, the other great Mayan city of the time, to contain the spread of militant Calakmul, also called the "Kingdom of the Serpent". Calakmul won two of these wars, in 599 and 611. B'akaal rulers claimed that their royal lineage originated in the distant past, some even boasting that their genealogy dated to the creation of the world, which in Mayan mythology was in the year 3114 B.C. Modern archaeological theories speculate that the first dynasty of their rulers was probably of Olmec ethnicity.

During the Tollan phase, the city reached its greatest extent and population. Some authors estimate the urban area of Tollan-Xicocotitlan at the time was between 5 and 16 km2, with a population of between 16,000 and 55,000 people. During this phase the monumental space that constitutes the Tula archaeological zone was consolidated in two pyramidal bases, two courts for the ballgame and several palaces occupied by the Toltec elite. By this time, Tollan-Xicocotitlan had become not only the nexus of the Mesoamerican commercial networks, it also hosted a military-theocratic elite who imposed their rule in various parts of Mesoamerica, whether by military conquest or political alliance, or by establishing colonies in strategic places.

Teotihuacan was listed as a World Heritage Site by Unesco in 1987. Teotihuacan archaeological excavations continue to this day, and have resulted in a gradual increase in the quality and quantity of knowledge of the city's history; even so, such important facts as its original name and the ethnic affiliation of its founders are still unknown. It is known that it was a cosmopolitan place, however, by the documented presence of groups from the Gulf coast or the Central Valleys of Oaxaca.

Located in the modern town of the same name, Tzintzuntzan was the ceremonial center of the pre-Columbian Tarascan state capital. Its ruins are situated on a large artificial platform excavated into the Yahuarato hillside, with a commanding view of Lake Pátzcuaro. There, five rounded pyramids called "Yácatas" face the lake. The site has a small archaeological museum.

Puuc style
The buildings of Chichen Itza show a large number of architectural and iconographic elements that some historians have called Mexicanized. The influence of cultures from central Mexico, mixed with the Puuc style of the upper peninsula, is visible in its Classic Maya architecture. The presence of these elements from the cultures of the Mexican Plateau was conjectured recently to have been a result of a mass migration to, or conquest of, the Mayan city by Toltec groups. However, recent studies suggest that they may have been the cultural expression of a prestigious and widespread political system during the Early Postclassic in Mesoamerica.

Oasisamerican style

Oasisamerican peoples, whose influence was marked primarily by commercial exchanges between the north and south of Mexico, had widespread contact with the other peoples of Mesoamerica in the Northern Hemisphere, leading to a unique style of building construction in the Americas. The archaeological record of this style is scant compared to that of Chan Chan in northern Peru.

Paquimé was a prehistoric settlement that had cultural influence in the northwest of the Sierra Madre Occidental, most of modern-day western Chihuahua and some areas of what is now the states of Sonora, Arizona, Utah, Colorado and New Mexico. Researchers estimate that the population probably grew to about 3,500 inhabitants, but their linguistic and ethnic affiliation is unknown.

The site is known for its adobe buildings and their "T" form doors. Only a fraction of its total length is fenced and less is excavated. Its buildings have traits of Oasisamerican culture and demonstrate the skill of the Prehispanic architects of the region who designed multifamily adobe houses up to four stories high utilizing wood, reed, and stone as supplementary building materials.

Colonial Period
In the first two decades of the 20th century, the nature of Mexican architecture and culture was at the core of a complex and rich dialogue of Mexican colonial architecture, with many of the best minds in this country paying attention to it. To various degrees, Baxter, Acevedo, Mariscals, García, and other intellectuals tried hard to organize the history of Mexican architecture, better define the whole industry, reform architectural teaching, preserve colonial architecture, and expand the understanding of the extraordinary architectural history of Mexico. These scholars and architects blended architectural history with beliefs about the ethnic cultural conditions, diversity and integration, the contributions of indigenous Mexicans to colonial architecture, and deep participation in the visual effects of Churrigueresque and Baroque architecture surfaces and facades. These are the roots of the development of modern architecture in Mexico.

With the establishment of Spanish rule in Mexico, the first churches and monasteries were built utilizing architectural principles of classical order and the Arabic formalities of Spanish mudéjarismo. Great cathedrals and civic buildings were later built in the Baroque and Mannerist styles, while in rural areas estate manor houses and hacienda buildings  incorporated Mozarabic elements. The syncretic Indian-Christian mode of architecture developed organically as Indians interpreted European architectural and decorative features in the native, pre-Columbian style called  ('laborer' or 'mason', from Nahuatl).

Organizing local indigenous communities around monastic centers was one of the solutions devised by friars of the mendicant orders in the 16th century to convert the large number of indigenous non-Catholics in New Spain. These were conceived of as fortresses, but based architecturally on the European conventual model, incorporating new features such as the open chapel and atriums with a stone cross at the center; they were characterized by different decorative elements.

Early in the history of the Indian reductions, the convents became community training centers, so to speak, where the Indians could learn various arts and trades as well as European social customs and the Spanish language, obtain medical treatment, and even hold funerals. These buildings, spread across the central part of what is now Mexico, contain superb examples of the indigenous mastery of architecture and the sculptural arts. Their work, created under the supervision of the Catholic friars, was done in the  style, which originated in the architectural stone carving and decorative painting practiced by their ancestors before the Spanish conquest.

The first cathedrals in Mexico were built beginning in 1521 when New Spain was established; from that time onward ever more elaborate structures were built, a prime example being the Mérida Cathedral in Yucatán, built in the Renaissance architectural style and one of the oldest cathedrals in the New World.

Mexican Baroque

The dominant form of art and architecture during most of the colonial period was Baroque. In 1577, Pope Gregory XIII created the Academy of Saint Luke with the purpose of breaking with Renaissance style. Its aim was to use painting and sculpture in and on churches to create iconography to teach and reinforce Church doctrine. In Spain, the first works in Baroque include the Patio of the Kings in El Escorial monastery.

Spanish Baroque was transplanted to Mexico and developed its own varieties from the late 16th to late 18th centuries. Baroque art and architecture were mostly applied to churches. One reason for this was that in nearly all cities, towns and villages, the church was the center of the community, with streets in a regular pattern leading away from it. This reflected the Church's role as the center of community life. Church design in New Spain tended to follow the rectilinear pattern of squares and cubes, rather than contemporary European churches that favored curves and orbs.

The spaces of Mexican Baroque churches tend to be more introverted than their European counterparts, focusing especially on the main altar. The purpose was contemplation and meditation. The rich ornamentation was created to keep attention focused on the central themes. This was especially true of the main altar.

Columns and pilasters were an important element of Mexican Baroque style, in particular the part of the column between the capital and the base, which can be categorized in six types including Salomonic and estipite (an inverted truncated pyramid) in the later colonial period. Even if the rest of the structure was not covered in decoration, such as in the "purist" style, columns and spaces between doubled columns were profusely decorated.

As it developed in Mexico, the Baroque split into a number of sub-styles and techniques. "Estucado" Baroque was purely decorative and did not employ any architectural features. Features were molded from stucco with intricate detail and either covered in gold leaf or paint. This form reached its height in the 17th century in Puebla and Oaxaca. Surviving examples include the Chapel del Rosario in Puebla and the Church at Tonantzintla. One reason this style fell out of favor was that the stucco work eventually dissolved.

Talavera Baroque was a variety mostly confined to the states of Puebla and Tlaxcala. The main defining feature was the use of hand-painted ceramic tiles of the Talavera type. This style came into being here because of the pottery industry. Tiles are mostly found on the bell towers, domes and main portals of the exterior. They are also found interspersed on the rest of the facade as accents to brickwork. This type of Baroque first appeared in the 17th century and reached its height in the 18th. While wholesale use of this style is mostly confined to two states, elements of this tile work appear, especially in domes, in many other parts of the country.

In the late Baroque era artists in the provincial area of New Spain created intricately textured church facades and interiors similar to those of the major cities. It had a more two-dimensional quality, which led it to be called Mestizo Baroque or Folk Baroque. The two-level effect was less based on sculptural modeling and more on drilling into the surface to create a screen-like effect. This has some similarities to pre-Hispanic stone and wood carving, allowing elements of indigenous art tradition to survive.

Other Baroque styles in Mexico did not adorn all of the surfaces of the interior or exterior but focused their ornamentation on columns, pilasters and the spaces between pairs of these supports. Medallions and niches with statues commonly appear between columns and pilasters, especially around main portals and windows. Decorative patterns in columns after were wavy grooves (called ).

Another late Baroque style in Mexico is often called Mexican Churrigueresque after the Spanish Churriguera family, who made altarpieces at this time. However, the more technical term for this very exuberant, anti-classical style is ultra Baroque. It originated in Spain as architectural decoration, spreading to sculpture and furniture carving. In Spain, the definitive element of ultra Baroque was the use of the Salomonic column along with the profuse decoration. In Mexico, the Salomonic column appears as well but the main distinctive aspect of Mexican ultra Baroque is the use of the estipite column in both buildings and altarpieces. This is not a true column, but rather an elongated base in the form of an inverted, truncated pyramid. This can be seen in the Mexico City Cathedral in the Altar of the Kings and the main portal of the Tabernacle.

Ultra Baroque was introduced by Jerónimo Balbás into Mexico, whose design for an altar at the Seville Cathedral was the inspiration for the Altar of the Kings, constructed in 1717. Balbás used estípites to convey a sense of fluidity, but his Mexican followers flattened the facades and aligned the estípites, with less dynamic results. This is what Lorenzo Rodríguez did to Balbás design for the Altar of the Kings. He also created a stronger horizontal division between the first and second levels, which derived Mexican ultra Baroque from the Spanish version. The ultra Baroque appeared when Mexican mines were producing great wealth, prompting numerous building projects. Much of Mexican ultra Baroque can be seen in and the city of Guanajuato and its mines. For this reason, the style became more developed in Mexico than in Spain.

The combination of Indian and Arabic decorative influences, with an extremely expressive interpretation of the churrigueresque, could explain the variety and intensity of the Baroque in New Spain. Even more than its Spanish counterpart, the American Baroque developed as a style of stucco decoration. Twin towers facades of many American cathedrals of the 17th century have medieval roots.

To the north, the richest province of the 18th century, New Spain, the current Mexico, was an architecture fantastically extravagant and visually frenetic that is Mexican churrigueresque. This ultrabaroque style culminates in the works of Lorenzo Rodríguez, whose masterpiece is the Sagrario Metropolitano in Mexico City (1749-1769). Other notable examples are in remote mining towns. For example, the sanctuary of Ocotlán (begun in 1745) is a first-Baroque cathedral, whose surface is covered with bright red tiles, which contrast with a plethora of compressed ornament applied generously on the front and sides of the towers. The true capital of Mexican Baroque is Puebla, where the abundance of hand-painted tiles and local gray stone led to a very personal and localized evolution of style, with a pronounced Indian flavor.

The New Spanish Baroque is an artistic movement that appeared in what is now Mexico in the late 16th century, approximately, which was preserved until the mid-18th century. From the Portuguese word barrueco meaning unclean, mottled, flamboyant, daring, the most striking example of New Spanish Baroque art is in religious architecture, where indigenous artisans gave it a unique character. Highlights include the Metropolitan Cathedral of Mexico City with his Altar of the Kings, the church of Santa María Tonantzintla in the Puebla State, the Jesuit convent of Tepotzotlán in the State of Mexico, the Chapel of the Rosary in the church of Santo Domingo of the city of Puebla, the convent and the church of Santo Domingo de Guzmán in Oaxaca, and the church of Santa Prisca in Taxco, Guerrero State.

The Biblioteca Palafoxiana, considered by some historians the first public library in the Americas, was founded in 1646 by Bishop Juan de Palafox y Mendoza of Puebla, with a gift of 5,000 volumes to the Colegio de San Juan (which he had also founded), on the condition that they be made available to the general public, and not just to ecclesiastics and seminarians.

More than a century later, Francisco Fabián y Fuero ordered the construction of the premises which currently house the library in the vaulted hall on the Colegio's second floor. This was finished in 1773, and has two levels of bookshelves and a retablo, or altarpiece, a delicate work which houses an image of the Madonna of Trapani, an oil painting presumably modeled on the sculpture carved by the Sicilian master Nino Pisano in the mid-14th century. The bookshelves were the work of the viceregal cabinetmakers who carved in ayacahuite pine, cedar, and coloyote wood. The size of the collection continually increased, and a third level of bookshelves was added in the mid-19th century.

Neoclassicism

As part of the Spanish Enlightenment's cultural impact on New Spain, the crown established Academy of San Carlos in 1785 to train painters, sculptors, and architects in New Spain, under the direction of peninsular Spaniard Gerónimo Antonio Gil. The academy emphasized neoclassicism, which drew on the inspiration of the clean lines of Greek and Roman architecture.  Neoclassicism in architecture was directly linked to crown policies that sought to rein in the exuberance of the baroque, considered in "bad taste" and creating public buildings of "good taste" funded by the crown, such as the Palacio de Minería in Mexico City and the Hospicio Cabañas in Guadalajara, and the Alhóndiga de Granaditas in Guanajuato, all built in the late colonial era.

19th and early 20th century architecture

Townscapes changed little during the first half of the 19th century  in Mexico, until the French occupation during the Second Mexican Empire in the mid 1860s. Emperor Maximilian I brought a new set of urban design ideas to Mexico. Drawing from the mid-century Parisian redevelopment plan of Baron Haussmann, Maximillain administered the building of a broad new diagonal avenue- Paseo de la Reforma. This elegant boulevard ran for miles from the downtown National Palace to the lush Chapultepec Park where the Austrian ruler lived in the Chapultepec Castle. Along the broad Reforma, double rows of eucalyptus trees were planted, gas lamps installed, and the first mule-drawn streetcars were introduced. The development was the catalyst for a new phase of growth from downtown Mexico City to the west, a direction that would define the city's structure for the next half century.

During President Porfirio Díaz's terms (1876–1880, 1884–1911), patrons and practitioners of architecture manifested two impulses: to create an architecture that would indicate Mexico's participation in modernity and the emphasize Mexico's difference from other countries through the incorporation of local characteristics into the architecture. The first goal took precedence over the second during most of the 19th century.  Major infrastructure projects of building a railway network and a sanitation project to drain the central lake system (the desagűe) near Mexico City necessitated the civil engineers and architects.  Railway stations and bridges across ravines were designed and built. Old colonial buildings in the capital, such as the Nacional Palace, were refurbished, and the new penitentiary of Lecumberri was designed, conforming to the precepts of Jeremy Bentham's panopticon.

A modern, sophisticated Mexico City was the goal of President Diaz. Cast iron technology from Europe and the United States allowed for new building designs. Italian marble, European granite, bronzes and stained glass could now be imported. Diaz was determined to transform the landscape of the nation's capital into one reminiscent of Paris or London. It is not surprising that the most important architectural commissions of the Porfiriato were given to foreigners. Italian architect Adamo Boari designed the Postal Palace built by Gonzalo Garita (1902) and the National Theatre of Mexico (1904). The French architect Émile Bénard, who worked on the Legislative Palace in 1903, founded an architectural studio where he took Mexican students. Silvio Contri was responsible for the Secretariat of Communications and Public Works (1902–11). Neo-Gothic designs incorporated into the monumental public buildings of the early 20th century. The two best examples were the Central post office and the Palacio de Bellas Artes, designed by Italian architect Adamo Boari.

President Diaz had enacted a decree in 1877 that called for the placement of a series of political statues of Mexican heroes along the Paseo de la Reforma. Classical designs were used to build structures such as the Angel of Independence monument, the Monument to Cuauhtémoc, the monument to Benito Juárez, and the Columbus Statue. Diaz's conviction about the importance of public monuments in the urban landscape started a tradition that has become permanent in Mexico: public monuments in the 20th century landscape.

In the 19th century, Neo-Indigenist architecture played an active part of the representation of national identity as constructed by the Porfirian regime. The representation of the local in Mexican architecture was achieved mainly through themes and decorative motifs inspired by pre-Hispanic antiquity. These representations were essential to the construction of a common heritage by which the nation might be unified. The first building based on the ancient Mexican motifs built in the 19th century was the Monument to Cuauhtémoc executed by engineer Francisco Jiménez and the sculptor Miguel Noreña. Other 19th-century buildings incorporating pre-Hispanic decorative motifs include the monument to Benito Juarez in Paseo Juarez, Oaxaca (1889).

At the beginning of the 20th century, Luis Zalazar enthusiastically encouraged architects to create a national style of architecture based on the study of pre-Hispanic ruins. His writings would be influential for the nationalistic tendencies in Mexican architecture which developed during the second and third decade of the 20th century.

After the Mexican Revolution, successive Mexican regimes would use the pre-Hispanic past to represent the nation. Later architects also took inspiration from the architecture of the colonial period and regional architecture as the creation of a genuinely Mexican architecture became a pressing issue during the 20th century.

Modern and contemporary architecture

Fifteen years after the end of the Mexican Revolution in 1917, government endorsements for federal housing, educational, and health care building programs began. While the development of modern architecture in Mexico bears some noteworthy parallels to its North American and European counterparts, its trajectory highlights several unique characteristics, which challenged existing definitions modern architecture. During the post-Revolutionary period, idealization of the indigenous and the traditional symbolized attempts to reach into the past and retrieve what had been lost in the race toward modernization.

Functionalism, expressionism, and other schools have left their imprint on a large number of works in which Mexican stylistic elements have been combined with European and North American techniques.

The Institute of Hygiene (1925) in Popotla, Mexico, by José Villagrán García, was one of the first examples of this new national architecture. The studio designed by Juan O'Gorman in San Angel, Mexico City, for Diego Rivera and Frida Kahlo (1931–32) is a fine example of vanguard architecture built in Mexico.

In the mid-twentieth century, the architecture of Mexico City was affected by rapid economic and urban development, new construction techniques, demographic changes and politics. Mario Pani, José Villagrán García, Juan O'gorman and Luis Barragán designed major new works, played key roles and strongly influenced the industry. Since the 1920s, public customers have been the most significant clients of modern buildings, and these buildings often meet people's needs for better education, housing and healthcare. This period also witnessed the rise of modern suburbs, the evolution of single-family houses and the creation of cultural institutions, especially museums.

As in the past a few decades, architects use non-architectural art, especially painting, to distinguish their works. The legacy of the Mexican mural movement is most obviously reflected in the facades of the main buildings of the new University City, and the influence of the principles of international modernist planning is also very significant. In 1968, Mexico City hosted the Olympic Games. Architects, planners and designers created a network of buildings and images. These buildings and images are interdependent, showing Mexico's internationalization and history rooted in local history. In the 1970s, as the capital was occupied by buildings designed by non-architects, urban expansion and pollution both increased.

Colonial Revival Style 
Colonial buildings in Mexico were recalled in the first 25 years of the 20th century, such as the renovation and extension of the City Hall (1906). Over the next 30 years, architects transformed the buildings around the square, thus created a more visually coherent and immortal city center. By 1940, almost all Zócalo buildings were either true colonial buildings or their evocations.

 was the first architect to use colonial revival forms in new buildings near the city center. In 1917, he took the charge of designing the Sostres y Dosal building, a department store located on the corner of Correo Mayor, which is called Venustiano Carranza now. The volume and striking rounded corners of this five-story building are reminiscent of the Porfirian shopping palace in Art Nouveau style. Its rustic and classical western entrance echoes the Renaissance architecture. But Mariscal used 18th century architecture when dealing with the facade surface. He used the H-shaped window frame commonly seen in Baroque palaces, and set up a mixed linear retaining wall on the top of the building. Between the third and fourth floors, blue and white tiles are arranged in a zigzag pattern. In the uppermost story, Mariscal placed three colonial revival windows, with the central one shaped like a six-pointed star. Apart from this, Angel Torres Torija used the facade of the Gaona Apartment Building in 1922, which might be one of the most fascinating and earliest purpose-built apartments in the capital, to commemorate the colonial architecture. Different from his counterparts, he used the form of a historian and explicit pictorial references to refer to the country’s political history. The Gaona Building was built outside the historic center, close to the most fashionable residences in Mexico City.

In the years after the Mexican Revolution, the main leaders of the Mexican government borrowed their ideas from architects and historians before the war and promoted the colonial revival style in various ways. The government of President Venustiano Carranza (1917-20) granted federal tax exemptions to those who built houses in the colonial-revival style. Many officials have sponsored the renovation of the historic center, the most famous of which is the Minister of Education José Vasconcelos who oversaw the design and construction of several major buildings.

Mid-century Modern
Mexico's first project of high-density, low-cost housing was the Centro Urbano Alemán (1947–49), Mexico City, by Mario Pani.

Perhaps the most ambitious project of modern architecture was the construction, begun in 1950, of Ciudad Universitaria outside Mexico City, a complex of buildings and grounds housing the National Autonomous University of Mexico. A cooperative venture, the project was directed by Carlos Lazo, Enrique Del Moral, and Pani. In the new campus the art of the Mexican muralists was incorporated into the architecture, beginning with Rivera's relief in the new Estadio Olímpico Universitario (1952), by Augusto Pérez Palacios, Jorge Bravo, and Raúl Salinas. The Rectory (1952), by Pani, del Moral, and Salvador Ortega Flores, includes murals by David Alfaro Siqueiros. The Science Building was designed by Eugenio Peschard and features the mural, The Conquest of Energy, by José Chávez Morado. Perhaps the most famous integration of mural art with the architecture is seen in the University Library, by O'Gorman, Gustavo Saavedra, and Juan Martínez de Velasco, which features a monumental mosaic design on the facade by O'Gorman. Another architect of note is Felix Candela (Spanish), who designed the expressionistic church Nuestra Señora de los Milagros.

The architecture of Mexico, specifically homes, has historically relied on strong, natural, and durable materials made from the earth. The typical home in Mexico was made using adobe construction with a thatch or palm roofing. In the 19th century, concrete was introduced to Mexican vernacular and became a very natural transition for Mexican architecture designs. It became known as a stronger and more durable material that acted in a similar matter as previously used traditional construction techniques, like adobe. The concrete block houses are built in a similar manner to some adobe homes in how blocks of adobe are placed with a person's hand. The concrete block residences are designed to allow the homes to be constructed easily and still maintained the opportunity to use thermal mass as a cooling strategy - similar to vernacular strategies in dry climates in Mexico.

This was a period of diverse experimentation and even structural innovation, as seen in the thin-shell concrete structures by the Spanish architect Felix Candela, such as his Church of the Miraculous Virgin (1953) in Mexico City and the Cosmic Rays Pavilion (1951) on the university campus. The integration of art and architecture became a constant in Mexican modern architecture, which can be seen in the courtyard of the Anthropology Museum (c. 1963–65) in Mexico City, by Pedro Ramírez Vázquez.

Another side of Mexican modern architecture is represented in the work of Luis Barragán. The houses that he designed in the 1950s and '60s explored a way to reconcile the lessons of Le Corbusier with the Spanish colonial tradition. This new synthesis created a completely original Modernist architecture that is uniquely adapted to its environment.

Contemporary
In Mexico the Brutalism of Teodoro González de León's Music Conservatory (1994) and the Neo-Barragánesque library (1994) by Legorreta coexist in the new National Centre of the Arts with the work of a younger generation of architects who are influenced by contemporary architecture in Europe and North America.

The School of Theatre (1994), by TEN Arquitectos, and the School of Dance (1994), by Luis Vicente Flores, express a modernity that reinforces the government's desire to present a new image of Mexico as an industrialized country with a global presence. Enrique Norten, the founder of TEN Arquitectors, was presented with the "Legacy Award" by the Smithsonian Institution for his contributions to the US arts and culture through his work.  In 2005 he received the "Leonardo da Vinci" World Award of Arts by the World Cultural Council and was the first Mies van der Rohe Award recipient for Latin American Architecture.

The refined work of Alberto Kalach and Daniel Alvarez stands out both in their numerous residences as well as in the San Juan de Letrán Station (1994) in Mexico City. The residential work of José Antonio Aldrete-Haas in Mexico City shows both the influence of the attenuated Modernism of the great Portuguese architect Álvaro Siza and a continuity with the lessons of Barragán. Other notable and emerging contemporary architects include Mario Schjetnan, Michel Rojkind, Tatiana Bilbao, Beatriz Peschard, Mauricio Rocha, Isaac Broid, Frida Escobedo, Productora, Macias Peredo,and Bernardo Gómez-Pimienta, with award winning works in Mexico, USA and Europe.

See also
 
 Enrique Norten
 Luis Barragán
 List of Mexican architects
 Mexican art

Further reading

Aldrich, Richard. Style in Mexican Architecture. Coral Gables: University of Miami Press 1968.
Anda Alanis, Enrique X. de. Evolución de la Arquitectura en México: Epocas Prehispanica, Virreinal Moderna, y Contemporánea. Mexico City: Panorama Editorial 1987.
Anda Alanis, Enrique X. de. La Arquitectura de la Revolución: Corrientes y Estilos en la Década de los Veinte. Mexico City: UNAM, Instituto de Investigaciones Estéticas  1990.
Anda Alanis, Enrique X. de. Ciudad de México: Arquitectura 1921-1970. Seville: Consejería de Obras Públicas y Transportes, and Mexico: Gobierno del Distrito Federal 2001.
Baxter, Sylvester. Spanish-Colonial Architecture in Mexico 10 vols. 1901.
Burian, Edward R. ed., Modernity and the Architecture of Mexico. Austin: University of Texas Press 1994.
Carranza, Luis. Architecture as Revolution: Episodes in the History of Modern Mexico. Austin: University of Texas Press 2010. 
Cetto, Max.  Modern Architecture in Mexico. New York: Praeger 1961.
Donahue-Wallace, Kelly. Art and Architecture in Viceregal Latin America, 1521-1821. Albuquerque: University of New Mexico Press, 2008.
Fraser, Valerie. Building the New World: Studies in the Modern Architecture of Latin America, 1930-1960. London: Verso 2000.
Gómez, Lilia and Miguel Angel Quevdo, Testimonios vivos, 20 arquitectos. Cuadernos de Arquitectura y Conservación del Patrimonio Artístico. Mexico Citiy: Instituto Nacional de Bellas Artes 1981.
Grove, Richard. Art and Architecture in Mexico. London: Thames & Hudson 2013.
Katzman, Israel. Arquitectura del siglo XIX en México. UNAM 1973.
Lira Vázquez, Carlos. Para una historia de la arquitectura mexicana.  Mexico City: Universidad Autónoma Metropolitana Azcapotzalco 1990.
Martínez Gutiérrez, Patricia. El Palacio de Hierro: Arranque dela modernidad arquitectónica en la Ciudad de México. Mexico city: Instituto de Investigaciones Estéticas, UNAM 2005.
Olsen, Patrice Elizabeth. Artifacts of Revolution: Architecture, Society and Politics in Mexico City, 1920-1940. Lanham MD: Rowman & Littlefield 2008.
O'Rourke, Kathryn. Modern Architecture in Mexico City: History, Representation, and the Shaping of the Capital. Pittsburgh: University of Pittsburgh Press 2016.
Reese, Carol McMichael. "The Urban Development of Mexico City, 1850-1930" in Planning Latin America's Capital Cities: 1850-1950. Arturo Almandoz, ed. New York: Routledge 2002.
Tovar de Teresa, Guillermo. The City of Palaces: Chronicle of a Lost Heritage. (Mexico: Vuelta 1990)

References

External links

 
Mexican art
Mexican culture